Roa is a village in southeastern Ivory Coast. It is in the sub-prefecture of Adiaké, Adiaké Department, Sud-Comoé Region, Comoé District.

Roa was a commune until March 2012, when it became one of 1126 communes nationwide that were abolished.

Notes

Former communes of Ivory Coast
Populated places in Comoé District
Populated places in Sud-Comoé